Tibet, the pseudonym of Gilbert Gascard (29 October 1931 – 3 January 2010), was a French cartoonist in the Franco-Belgian comics tradition. Tibet, who debuted in 1947, is known for work produced for the Franco-Belgian comics magazine Tintin, most notably the long-running series Ric Hochet and Chick Bill.

References

Bibliography
 Chick Bill, with scripts by Greg, André-Paul Duchâteau, René Goscinny, 71 albums published since 1954, Le Lombard
 Ric Hochet, with André-Paul Duchâteau (scenario), 76 albums published since 1963, Le Lombard
 Le Club des "Peur-de-Rien", with Greg, (scenario), 9 albums published since 1966, Le Lombard
 El Mocco le terrible, 1977, Chlorophylle
 Dave O'Flynn, 2 albums in 1979, Chlorophylle,
 Les aventures de Globul, with René Goscinny (scenario), 1984, Magic Strip
 Mouminet et Alphonse, with Greg (scenario), 1984, Magic Strip
 Aldo Rémy'', 2 albums since 2006, Glénat

External links
 Tibet biography on Lambiek Comiclopedia
 Tibet publications in Belgian Tintin, French Tintin and *Spirou BDoubliées 
 Bob de Moor index of Tintin and Kuifje covers LeJournalDeTintin.free 
 Tibet albums Bedetheque 

1931 births
2010 deaths
French comics artists
French comics writers
French caricaturists
French male writers